Michel Mathieu may refer to:

Michel Mathieu (French politician) (1944–2010), High Commissioner of the Republic in French Polynesia
Michel Mathieu (Canadian politician) (1838–1916), lawyer, judge and member of the Canadian House of Commons

See also
 Michael Mathieu (born 1984), Bahamian sprinter